Iotuba chengjiangensis (sometimes mis-spelt Lotuba) is a 515 myo Cambrian worm known from the Chengjiang biota. Originally interpreted as a phoronid, the organism is now recognized as an annelid cage worm affiliated with the Flabelligeridae and Acrocirridae, which Zhang et al grouped together in the new superfamily Flabelligeroidea.

Anatomy 
Iotuba was a couple of centimetres long and half a centimetre in width.  Internally it is characterized by a through gut flanked by a pair of boudinaged tubes interpreted as nephridia ("kidneys").  Its trunk is adorned with small conical papillae ("microspines").  Its "head" bears a pair of tentaculate, horseshoe-shaped branchiae ("gills"), and can be withdrawn into the body; it is surrounded by a cage of spines interpreted as chaetae, equivalent to those of the flabelligerid "cage worms".

History of interpretation 

Iotuba was originally interpreted as a phoronid based on a misinterpretation of the single then-available specimen as harbouring a U-shaped gut and tentacles – an interpretation that was soon thrown into question.  The holotype was independently named – by the same author – as Eophoronis, but as neither of these nomenclatural acts contained a diagnosis, they were invalid under the International Code of Zoological Nomenclature until formally defined by Zhang et al. in 2023.

Previous comparisons to ecdysozoan worms such as Louisella. have been ruled out based on the construction of the anterior region and other morphological detals.
Instead, the organism has been linked with the cirratliform annelids, specifically Flabelligeridae – an interpretation that fits in with morphological and molecular data in a phylogenetic context.

Occurrence 

Iotuba has been reported from the Chengjiang biota, with a possible additional occurrence in the Haiyan Lagerstätte

References

Cambrian fossil record
Fossil taxa described in 2023